The Amateurs–Professionals Match was an annual men's team golf competition between teams of golfers from Great Britain and Ireland representing amateurs and professionals. It was played from 1956 to 1960. The Professionals won four of the five contests but the Amateurs won in 1958. The match was organised by the R&A and the PGA.

History
Two matches between teams of amateurs and professionals had been played in late 1954 and early 1955. The first was a match between the British 1954 Joy Cup team and a team of amateurs in November 1954. The professionals won the foursomes 3–2 but the singles were washed out. The second was a match between the British 1955 Walker Cup team and a team of professionals led by Henry Cotton played in March 1955. The professionals won 10½–4½. In both these matches the professionals conceded a 2-hole start. The idea of an official annual match emerged out of these earlier matches.

The amateurs recorded their only win in 1958. Trailing 3–2 after the foursomes they won 7 of the 10 singles match and halved another. Of the professionals, only Dai Rees and Peter Alliss won their matches while Harry Weetman got a half against Guy Wolstenholme.

Format
The match was contested over two days with 36-hole foursomes on the first day and 36-hole singles matches on the second day. There were 5 foursomes and 10 singles. Matches were played on level terms.

Results

Appearances
The following are those who played in at least one of the five matches.

Amateurs
  John Beharrell 1956
  David Blair 1956, 1960
  Michael Bonallack 1957, 1958, 1959, 1960
  Alan Bussell 1956, 1957, 1959
  Joe Carr 1956, 1957, 1958, 1959, 1960
  Martin Christmas 1960
  Tom Craddock 1959
  Frank Deighton 1956, 1957
  David Frame 1960
  Reid Jack 1956, 1957, 1958, 1959
  Michael Lunt 1958, 1959
  David Marsh 1959
  Arthur Perowne 1956, 1958
  Sandy Saddler 1959, 1960
  Philip Scrutton 1956, 1957
  Doug Sewell 1957, 1958, 1959, 1960
  Alec Shepperson 1956, 1957, 1958, 1959, 1960
  Alan Thirlwell 1957, 1958
  James Walker 1958, 1960
  Guy Wolstenholme 1956, 1957, 1958, 1960

Professionals
  Jimmy Adams 1956
  Peter Alliss 1957, 1958, 1959
  Fred Boobyer 1960
  Ken Bousfield 1957, 1958, 1959, 1960
  Harry Bradshaw 1956, 1957, 1958
  Eric Brown 1957, 1958
  Peter Butler 1960
  Norman Drew 1959
  Max Faulkner 1956, 1957
  Tom Haliburton 1960
  Jimmy Hitchcock 1959
  Bernard Hunt 1957, 1958, 1959, 1960
  Jack Jacobs 1957
  John Jacobs 1958
  Arthur Lees 1956
  Eric Lester 1957, 1959
  George Low 1956, 1960
  Peter Mills 1957, 1958, 1959, 1960
  Christy O'Connor Snr 1956, 1958, 1959
  John Panton 1956
  Dai Rees 1956, 1957, 1958, 1959, 1960
  Syd Scott 1956, 1960
  David Snell 1960
  Norman Sutton 1956
  Harry Weetman 1958, 1959

References

Team golf tournaments
Recurring sporting events established in 1956